The Commander of the Air Force is the institutional head of the Egyptian Air Force. The current commander is Lieutenant General Mohamed Abbas Helmy

List of commanders
The following individuals have had command of the Egyptian Air Force:

Royal Egyptian Air Force

Egyptian Air Force

Egyptian Air Force and Defense

Egyptian Air Force

References

Egypt
Egyptian Air Force
Egyptian military personnel